Gulf oil spill may refer to:
 Ixtoc I oil spill – Gulf of Mexico 1979 
 Gulf War oil spill – Persian Gulf 1991
 Deepwater Horizon oil spill – Gulf of Mexico 2010